The three teams in this group played against each other on a home-and-away basis. The group winner England qualified for the sixth FIFA World Cup held in Sweden.

Standings

Matches

References

External links
FIFA official page
RSSSF - 1958 World Cup Qualification
Allworldcup
Englandstats.com

1
1956–57 in English football
Qual
1956–57 in Republic of Ireland association football
1957–58 in Republic of Ireland association football
1956–57 in Danish football
1958 in Danish football